George Pearson Glen Kidston (23 January 1899 – 5 May 1931) was an English record-breaking aviator and motor racing driver. He was one of the "Bentley Boys"

Career
His father, Archibald Glen Kidston, was a grandson of the original A.G. Kidston, founder of the firm A.G. Kidston & Co, who was a metal and machinery merchant in Glasgow with interests in the Clyde Shipping Company, local solicitors, accountants and banking interests amalgamated into the Clydesdale Bank. Kidston was a member of the well-known Bentley Boys of the late 1920s, and possibly the wealthiest of that already wealthy set. Kidston was one of the four, core Grosvenor Square-based Bentley team drivers, whose day-long parties passed into contemporary legend.

Following repatriation he served in the dreadnought , with the British Grand Fleet at the Battle of Jutland, running gunnery orders on open deck under direct enemy fire. Kidston served on several leading-edge British submarines, including the notorious , which he served on in North Sea trials. During the trials the X1 became embedded in the seabed as its gauges were faulty. In December 1926 he received command of an H-class submarine, the Beardmore-built , built at Portsmouth. Away from his duties as a submariner, he was an early pioneer of naval flight.

Glen Kidston competed in numerous motor races including the Monte Carlo Rally, Isle of Man TT motorcycle races, and Shelsley Walsh hillclimb. As a naval amateur he raced a Sunbeam motorcycle up the hill climb in Hong Kong and conducted speed trials on the sands, bringing the bike with him in his submarine which was patrolling the China Station. Kidston entered the 1929 Irish Grand Prix Éireann Cup at Phoenix Park but was narrowly beaten by the Alfa Romeo of former Russian Imperial Guard officer Boris Ivanowski. This was achieved at the expense of Britons Glen Kidston and Henry Birkin, whose Bentleys were second and third respectively. He also owned and raced the first Bugatti in the UK and entered the Le Mans 24-hour race in 1929 and 1930. On the second occasion he won the race, driving a Bentley Speed Six in partnership with Woolf Barnato, with the Bentley team delivering a 1-2-3-4 victory.

In 1929 Kidston was travelling from Croydon to Amsterdam in a German airliner. 21 mins into the flight he sensed an imminent crash and assumed the safety position. The plane's co-pilot, Prince Eugen von Schaumberg-Lippe was ejected from the plane and initially survived but died of his injuries the next day. On impact, Kidston kicked his way out of the fuselage while in flames, and doused himself in the wet grass.  He was then hospitalised with extensive burns. Kidston was the sole survivor.

Kidston was a renowned big game hunter and expert shot, and travelled on pioneering safaris in remote Kenyan districts. Films of these expeditions, of his early naval and other aviation and Bentley teamwork are held at the British Film Institute due to their quality and pioneering footage.

In April 1931, Kidston completed a record breaking flight from Netheravon, Wiltshire to Cape Town, South Africa. He completed the journey in just 6½ days, flying his own specially adapted Lockheed Vega monoplane and averaging 131 mph. However, Kidston was never to make the return trip. After earlier near misses in aeroplane, motorcycle, speed boat and even submarine accidents, Kidston was killed, only a year after his Le Mans triumph, when his borrowed de Havilland Puss Moth broke up in mid-air while flying through a dust storm over the Drakensberg mountains.

News of Kidston's death broke in the London evening papers and Margaret Whigham (later Duchess of Argyll) and Barbara Cartland, both amongst Kidston's lovers, claim in their memoirs to have fainted on leaving the theatre and seeing the headlines. The Hollywood femme fatale Pola Negri is also reputed to have known Kidston.

Family 
He married Nancy Miriel Denise Soames in 1925 and had a son, Archibald Martin Glen (1927–1978). Cath Kidston is his granddaughter. His nephew is classic car dealer, collector, commentator and journalist, Simon Kidston.

Memorials 
Kidston's gravestone at St. Peter's in Glasbury-upon-Wye on the Welsh borders, his childhood home, reads "Time and tide wait for no man", and has a sundial. A memorial to him, an aluminium propeller set in stone, stands at the crash site.

Racing record

Complete 24 Hours of Le Mans results

References

1899 births
1931 deaths
24 Hours of Le Mans winning drivers
Aviators killed in aviation accidents or incidents
Bentley Boys
British aviation record holders
English aviators
English racing drivers
Glen
Royal Navy officers of World War I
Sole survivors
Victims of aviation accidents or incidents in 1931
Victims of aviation accidents or incidents in South Africa